St Bartholomew's Church, Elvaston is a Grade I listed parish church in the Church of England in Elvaston, Derbyshire.

History

The church dates from the 13th century, and was completed in 1474 with funding from Walter Blount, 1st Baron Mountjoy. Some of the tombs and memorials were moved to give a better view of the altar. The new chancel has no window at the east end, but a large reredos of carved white clunch filled the whole end, which was richly carved with subjects and figures, and effectively lit by two new traceried windows of three lights each in the north and south walls of the sanctuary. The pavements of the sanctuary and chancel were laid with black and white marble. The floor of the nave was laid with wooden blocks, and the aisles with slate and white stone. The plaster was removed from the walls. The roofs and various parts of the walls were decorated with gold and blue, with monograms of "B" for St Bartholomew.

Parish status
The church is in a joint parish with 
All Saints’ Church, Aston-upon-Trent
St Wilfrid's Church, Barrow-upon-Trent
St Andrew’s Church, Twyford
St James’ Church, Swarkestone
St James Church, Shardlow
St Mary the Virgin’s Church, Weston-on-Trent

Memorials
The church contains memorials to:
Henry and Margaret Robinson (d. 1829)
Elizabeth, Countess of Harrington (d. 1912)
John Stanhope (d. 1638)
Charles Stanhope, 3rd Earl of Harrington (d. 1829) by Antonio Canova
Leicester Stanhope, 5th Earl of Harrington (d. 1862)
Sydney Stanhope, 6th Earl of Harrington (d. 1866)
Lieutenant Talbot FitzRoy Eden Stanhope (1896 – 1915)
Algernon Russell Gayleard Stanhope (1838 – 1847)

Organ

The church has a pipe organ by Eustace Ingram dating from 1904. A specification of the organ can be found on the National Pipe Organ Register.

See also
Grade I listed churches in Derbyshire
Grade I listed buildings in Derbyshire
Listed buildings in Elvaston, Derbyshire

References

Sources

 

Church of England church buildings in Derbyshire
Grade I listed churches in Derbyshire